is an underground metro station located in Minami-ku, Nagoya, Aichi, Japan operated by the Nagoya Municipal Subway’s Sakura-dōri Line. It is located 13.8 kilometers from the terminus of the Sakura-dōri Line at Nakamura Kuyakusho Station.

History
Tsurusato Station was opened on March 30, 1994.

Lines
 
 (Station number: S16)

Layout
Tsurusato Station has a single underground island platform with platform screen doors.

Platforms

External links
 Tsurusato Station official web site 

Railway stations in Japan opened in 1994
Railway stations in Aichi Prefecture